Spain participated in the Eurovision Song Contest 2005 with the song "Brujería" written by Alfredo Panebianco. The song was performed by the group Son de Sol. The Spanish broadcaster Televisión Española (TVE) organised the national final Eurovisión 2005: Elige nuestra canción in order to select the Spanish entry for the 2005 contest in Kyiv, Ukraine. The national final consisted of a semi-final and a final and involved twelve artists and songs. Six entries ultimately qualified to compete in the televised final where a public televote exclusively selected "Brujería" performed by Son de Sol as the winner, receiving 24.2% of the votes.

As a member of the "Big Four", Spain automatically qualified to compete in the final of the Eurovision Song Contest. Performing in position 10, Spain placed twenty-first out of the 24 participating countries with 28 points.

Background 

Prior to the 2005 contest, Spain had participated in the Eurovision Song Contest forty-four times since its first entry in 1961. The nation has won the contest on two occasions: in 1968 with the song "La, la, la" performed by Massiel and in 1969 with the song "Vivo cantando" performed by Salomé, the latter having won in a four-way tie with France, the Netherlands and the United Kingdom. Spain has also finished second four times, with Karina in 1971, Mocedades in 1973, Betty Missiego in 1979 and Anabel Conde in 1995. In 2004, Spain placed tenth with the song "Para llenarme de ti" performed by Ramón.

The Spanish national broadcaster, Televisión Española (TVE), broadcasts the event within Spain and organises the selection process for the nation's entry. TVE confirmed their intentions to participate at the 2005 Eurovision Song Contest on 16 December 2004. From 2000 to 2004, TVE had set up national finals featuring a competition among several artists and songs to choose both the song and performer to compete at Eurovision for Spain, including the reality television music competition Operación Triunfo. The procedure was continued for their 2005 entry but without the incorporation of Operación Triunfo.

Before Eurovision

Eurovisión 2005: Elige nuestra canción 
Eurovisión 2005: Elige nuestra canción was the national final organised by TVE that took place at the Estudios Buñuel in Madrid, hosted by Carlos Lozano, Patricia Pérez and Ainhoa Arbizu. The national final consisted of two shows which commenced on 4 March 2005 and concluded with a winning song and artist during the final on 5 March 2005. All shows were broadcast on La 1 and TVE Internacional.

Competing entries 
A submission period was open from 31 January 2005 until 10 February 2005. Only artists signed to record labels were eligible to submit entries. At the conclusion of the submission period, 100 entries were received. A committee consisting of journalists, producers and professionals at TVE evaluated the entries received and selected twelve entries for the national final. The twelve competing acts were announced on 17 February 2005 via TVE's official website. On 18 and 22 February 2005, "Dame el oportunidad" performed by Tony Álvarez and "Déjame" performed by Mayka were withdrawn from the national final and replaced with the songs "El swatch" performed by A-Crew and "Echo de menos" performed by Felipe Conde, respectively.

The competing songs were premiered between 28 February and 4 March 2005 on the morning show Por la mañana on La 1, and on a special show, presented by Patricia Pérez and Ainoha Arbízu, that was broadcast on La 2.

Shows

Semi-final
The semi-final took place on 4 March 2005. The top six entries qualified for the final exclusively through a public televote. In addition to the performances of the competing entries, guest performers included former Eurovision contestant Rosa López who represented Spain in 2002, and former Junior Eurovision contestant María Isabel who represented Spain and won in 2004.

Final
The final took place on 5 March 2005. The six entries that qualified from the preceding semi-final competed and the winner, "Brujería" performed by Son de Sol, was selected exclusively through a public televote. In addition to the performances of the competing entries, guest performers included Francisco, Marta Sánchez and Paulina Rubio.

Ratings

At Eurovision
According to Eurovision rules, all nations with the exceptions of the host country, the "Big Four" (France, Germany, Spain and the United Kingdom) and the ten highest placed finishers in the 2004 contest are required to qualify from the semi-final in order to compete for the final; the top ten countries from the semi-final progress to the final. As a member of the "Big 4", Spain automatically qualified to compete in the final on 21 May 2005. In addition to their participation in the final, Spain is also required to broadcast and vote in the semi-final on 19 May 2005. During the running order draw for the semi-final and final on 22 March 2005, Spain was placed to perform in position 10 in the final, following the entry from Cyprus and before the entry from Israel. Spain placed twenty-first in the final, scoring 28 points.

In Spain, both the semi-final and the final were broadcast on La 1 with commentary by Beatriz Pécker. The Spanish spokesperson, who announced the Spanish votes during the final, was Ainhoa Arbizu. The broadcast of the final was watched by 4.712 million viewers in Spain with a market share of 35.5%. This represented a decrease of 14.6% from the previous year with 2.114 million less viewers.

Voting 
Below is a breakdown of points awarded to Spain and awarded by Spain in the semi-final and grand final of the contest. The nation awarded its 12 points to Romanian in the semi-final and the final of the contest.

Points awarded to Spain

Points awarded by Spain

References

2005
Countries in the Eurovision Song Contest 2005
Eurovision
Eurovision